Léon Mercier Gouin (December 24, 1891 – October 16, 1983) was a French Canadian  barrister, professor, politician, and writer.

Born in Montreal, Quebec, the eldest son of Lomer Gouin, the Premier of Quebec from 1905 to 1920, and the grandson of Honoré Mercier, the Quebec Premier from 1887 to 1891, he received a Bachelor's degree from Loyola College in 1911 and studied at Oxford University. His brother, Paul Gouin, was also a politician. In 1917, he married Yvette Ollivier. They had four children: Lisette, Lomer, Thérèse and Olivier.

Gouin was appointed to the Senate of Canada in 1940 representing the senatorial division of De Salaberry, Quebec. A Liberal, he resigned in 1976.

References

External links
 
 

1891 births
1983 deaths
Canadian senators from Quebec
Loyola College (Montreal) alumni
People from Montreal
Alumni of the University of Oxford
Canadian King's Counsel